Parnassia palustris, the marsh grass of Parnassus, northern grass-of-Parnassus, or just grass-of-Parnassus, and bog star, is a flowering plant in the staff-vine family Celastraceae.

It is the county flower of Cumberland in England, and appears on its flag.

The name comes from ancient Greece: evidently the cattle on Mount Parnassus appreciated the plant; hence it was an "honorary grass". The specific epithet palustris is Latin for "of the marsh" and indicates its common habitat. It was described by the Greek physician Dioscorides, growing up a mountain in 1st century A.D.

Description
This perennial plant is not a grass, nor does it look like one, but grows from a short underground stem. It has long stemmed heart-shaped leaves, which are 4-12 in (10–30 cm) long. In the centre of the leaf, is the flowering stem. The stem holds a solitary white flower, blooming between July and October. The flower has 5 stamens around the centre. The flower produces a honey-like scent to attract pollinators.

Range and distribution
Parnassia palustris is native to northern temperate parts of Eurasia where it is found in wet moorlands and marshes. It is extinct from Algeria.

Uses

It was once used in herbal medicines, to treat disorders of the liver. An infusion of the leaves, (similar to a tea) was also used to treat indigestion. When added to wine or water, the leaves are claimed to dissolve kidney stones.

History
While finishing his schooling in the School of Mines at Freiberg from June 14, 1791, to February 26, 1792,
Alexander von Humboldt published three articles on plants in the Annalen der Botanik. These were his first of what the world famous explorer would produce. Notably, one was concerning "On the Motion of the Filaments of the Parnassia Palustris."

References

External links
 

palustris
Flora of Canada
Flora of the Western United States
Flora of Western Canada
Flora of Alaska
Flora of California
Flora of Colorado
Flora of the Sierra Nevada (United States)
Flora of the Rocky Mountains
Flora of England
Flora of Scotland
Plants described in 1753
Taxa named by Carl Linnaeus
Flora without expected TNC conservation status